Svetlana Sergeyevna Bukareva (born 25 June 1981) is a Russian former competitive figure skater. She is the 1996 Ondrej Nepela Memorial champion and the 1999 ISU Junior Grand Prix Final bronze medalist. 

Bukareva formerly coached Anna Ovcharova and Kristina Zaseeva.

Competitive highlights

References 

1981 births
Russian female single skaters
Living people
Figure skaters from Moscow